Carlos Alberto Torres Villarreal (born 10 January 1993) is a Venezuelan road cyclist, who currently rides for Venezuelan amateur team JHS Grupo Moya.

Major results
2016
 2nd Road race, National Road Championships
2017
 1st  Overall Vuelta a Venezuela
 1st Stage 6 Vuelta al Táchira
2018
 6th Overall Vuelta al Táchira
2021
 2nd Overall Vuelta a Venezuela

References

External links

1993 births
Living people
Venezuelan male cyclists